8815 Deanregas, provisional designation , is a Florian asteroid from the inner regions of the asteroid belt, approximately  in diameter. It was discovered on 23 February 1984, by Belgian astronomer Henri Debehogne at ESO's La Silla Observatory in northern Chile. The asteroid was named for American astronomer Dean Regas.

Orbit and classification 

Deanregas is a member of the Flora family, one of the largest asteroid clans of stony asteroid groupings. It orbits the Sun in the inner main-belt at a distance of 1.9–2.6 AU once every 3 years and 5 months (1,235 days). Its orbit has an eccentricity of 0.14 and an inclination of 6° with respect to the ecliptic.

Physical characteristics 

According to the survey carried out by NASA's Wide-field Infrared Survey Explorer with its subsequent NEOWISE mission, Deanregas measures 4.527 kilometers in diameter and its surface has an albedo of 0.285. As of 2017, Deanregas spectral type, as well as its rotation period and shape remain unknown.

Naming 

This minor planet was named for Dean Regas (born 1973), an astronomer at Cincinnati Observatory, responsible for science outreach activities and a national popularizer of astronomy. He is also a co-host of the prolific PBS show Star Gazers and author of Facts From Space. The approved naming citation was suggested by Fred N. Bowman and published by the Minor Planet Center on 5 January 2015.

References

External links 
 Asteroid Lightcurve Database (LCDB), query form (info )
 Dictionary of Minor Planet Names, Google books
 Discovery Circumstances: Numbered Minor Planets (5001)-(10000) – Minor Planet Center
 
 

008815
Discoveries by Henri Debehogne
Named minor planets
19840223